KBDI-TV, virtual channel 12 (VHF digital channel 13), is a Public Broadcasting Service (PBS) member television station serving Denver, Colorado, United States that is licensed to Broomfield. The station is owned by Colorado Public Television, Inc. KBDI-TV's studios are located at Welton and 29th Streets in the Five Points neighborhood (just northeast of downtown Denver). Its transmitter is located atop Squaw Mountain (just west of Evergreen, in Clear Creek County).

The station is branded on-air as PBS12 and was formerly branded as Colorado Public Television (or CPT12). KBDI-TV's programming reaches 85% of Colorado's population through its low-powered translators in Boulder and Colorado Springs, Colorado. It has also gained cable viewership throughout the Western Slope.

History

In 1977, a small group of community leaders formed the Front Range Educational Media Corporation (FREMCO) and filed an application with the Federal Communications Commission (FCC) for the VHF channel 12 license, the second of two channel frequencies in the Denver market assigned for noncommercial educational use (after channel 6, which signed as KRMA-TV in January 1956), as part of its policy to provide multiple educational television services throughout the United States. The FCC granted the license to FREMCO in 1979. KBDI-TV first signed on the air on February 22, 1980. The station operated initially from a garage in Broomfield and used a juice can as a makeshift transmitting antenna. The channel 12 allocation was originally intended for the University of Colorado at Boulder, but it was assigned to Broomfield-based FREMCO when the FCC's plans to assign an educational television station that would serve the Boulder area exclusively fell through. Later in the decade, KBDI installed a transmitter and broadcast tower atop 

Squaw Mountain, located  due west of Denver. It is the highest full-power television transmitting antenna in the United States.

During its early years, KBDI was known for its selection of programming that was not typical on most PBS stations at the time. This included reruns of classic TV shows including The Twilight Zone, The Honeymooners, The Wonderful World of Disney, and Alfred Hitchcock Presents. KBDI was known for its own long running music video program Teletunes (originally titled FM-TV) which began in early 1981, six months before cable channel MTV signed on. KBDI produced Homemovies, which showcased short movies produced by amateur filmmakers in Colorado, and aired The 90's, compiled from national and global video submissions often without narration.

With the new tower, KBDI expanded its signal to cover the entire Denver metropolitan area, and eventually the entire Front Range. In 1989, the station moved its offices and studios to Denver, originally at a facility on Stout Street, and then to a building on North Federal Boulevard. Finally in 1994, the station moved its operations into the new Five Points Media Center facility on Welton Street in the city's Five Points neighborhood. KBDI purchased the building outright in 2006.

In the late 1990s, as the station expanded its reach throughout Colorado via a network of low-powered repeaters and carriage on cable systems, the station phased out its call letters from its branding and started identifying as Colorado Public Television (or CPT12), ultimately applying the brand full-time in 2010. Today, the KBDI call letters are almost never mentioned on-air, with the exception of FCC-mandated station identifications. The brand also extended to its parent company in 2005, when the Front Range Educational Media Corporation was renamed as Colorado Public Television, Inc.

In 2004, KBDI entered into a multimedia partnership with CBS owned-and-operated station KCNC-TV (channel 4) and the Rocky Mountain News to jointly produce Colorado Decides, providing coverage of statewide debates, political analysis and election coverage. KBDI is a member of PBS' Program Differentiation Plan (PDP), previously known as the "Beta" group; as the Denver area's secondary PBS member station, it only airs 25% of the PBS network schedule.

Digital television

Digital channels
The station's digital signal is multiplexed:

Until 2019, KBDI-TV aired its main channel in the 480i resolution format, making it the largest PBS station by market size that did not broadcast in high definition. KBDI launched its digital signal on VHF channel 13 in 2003. With the sign-on of its digital signal, the station began carrying CPT12+ on digital subchannel 12.2, now featuring a mix of variety, instructional and public affairs programming from 4:00 a.m. to 4:00 p.m. and First Nations Experience (FNX) from 4:00 p.m. to 4:00 a.m. In 2008, the station began carrying the international programming service MHz Worldview on digital channel 12.3, On January 12, 2016, the station began broadcasting the programming service NHK World on digital channel 12.4.

Analog-to-digital conversion
KBDI-TV shut down its analog signal, over VHF channel 12, on February 17, 2009, the original date in which full-power television stations in the United States were to transition from analog to digital broadcasts under federal mandate. The station's digital signal remained on its pre-transition VHF channel 13. Through the use of Program and System Information Protocol, digital television receivers display the station's virtual channel as its former VHF analog channel 12.

The June 2009 digital transition did not address the coverage shadow, as the antenna remained at the same location.

Translators

Akron:  
Anton:  
Boulder: 
Colorado Springs: 
Cortez: 
Haxtun:  
Holyoke:  
Idalia:  
Julesburg:  
Peetz:  
Sterling:  
Wray:  
Yuma:

References

External links
 Official website
 
 

PBS member stations
Television channels and stations established in 1980
1980 establishments in Colorado
BDI-TV
Five Points, Denver
First Nations Experience affiliates
Broomfield, Colorado